Achterhuis may refer to:

Hans Achterhuis, Dutch philosopher
The Anne Frank House in Amsterdam
Het Achterhuis, the original Dutch title of The Diary of a Young Girl